Maracle is a surname. Notable people with the surname include:

Cheri Maracle (born 1972), Canadian actress
Clifford Maracle (1944–1996), Canadian artist
Henry Maracle (1904–1958), Canadian ice hockey player
Lee Maracle (1950–2021), Canadian First Nations poet and author
Norm Maracle (born 1974), Canadian ice hockey player